Herbert William Hardy Rigg (18 August 1923 – 16 March 2015) was an Australian cricketer. He played twelve first-class matches for Western Australia between 1946 and 1959.

Rigg had a long association with the Perth Cricket Club playing from 1939-40 to 1965-66 in a club record 284 matches, scoring 9,005 runs with eight centuries. In 1951-52 Rigg (90) and Ron Sarre (191) put on a club record opening partnership of 215 against Nedlands at the WACA Ground. 

Later he was one of Western Australia's leading cricket administrators. He served as chairman of the state's Cricket Council, and as state delegate to the Australian Cricket Board.

Rigg's brother Basil also played cricket for Western Australia. Their sister Marjorie and their mother represented Western Australia at hockey.

References

External links
 

1923 births
2015 deaths
Australian cricketers
Australian cricket administrators
Western Australia cricketers
Cricketers from Western Australia